Qaleh-ye Baleman (also Romanized as Qal‘eh-ye Bālemān, Qal‘eh Bālmān, and Qal‘eh-ye Bālmān; also known as Bālāman, Bālemān, and Bālemān) is a village in Astaneh Rural District, in the Central District of Shazand County, Markazi Province, Iran. At the 2006 census, its population was 489, in 129 families.

References 

Populated places in Shazand County